Red Mountain is a  summit of the Wallowa Mountains in Baker County, Oregon in the United States. It is located in the Eagle Cap Wilderness of the Wallowa National Forest.

See also
List of mountain peaks of Oregon

References

Mountains of Baker County, Oregon